Chaodong is a town in Fuchuan Yao Autonomous County, Guangxi, China.

Administrative division
As of 2016, the town is divided into one community and twenty-one villages: 
 Chaodong Community
 Chaodong
 Dongshui
 Huangbao
 Xiushui
 Heping
 Chashan
 Minzhu
 Tangyuan
 Bengbei
 Yingshang
 Ruzi
 Tongshi
 Longgui
 Shilin
 Gaozhai
 Youmu
 Chashan
 Huangsha
 Changtang
 Liyutang
 Fuxi

Geography
The town is situated at northwestern Fuchuan Yao Autonomous County, bordering Jiangyong County to the northwest, Gongcheng Yao Autonomous County to the southwest, and Chengbei to the northeast.

The Xiushui River flows through the town northeast to northwest.

Economy
The economy is supported primarily by farming and ranching. The region mainly produce tobacco, vegetables, grapes, Castanea mollissima and medicinal materials. Other products include sweet potato, pumpkin, and taro.

Tourist attractions
The town enjoys rich tourist resources. The most popular natural scenic spots are the Site of Jiangdong Academy, Site of Pangu Temple, cliff inscriptions, and Huilan Wind-rain Bridge. Ma Yin Temple is a National Historical and Cultural Site in Guangxi.

Transportation
The County Road X717 passes through the town.

References

Bibliography

Towns of Hezhou